Hauke Brückner (born 29 February 1980) is a German former footballer who is last known to have played as a defender or midfielder for Paloma.

Career

Brückner started his career with German third tier side FC St. Pauli, helping them earn promotion to the German second tier and reach the 2005–06 DFB-Pokal semifinals. In 2007, he signed for Holstein Kiel in the German fourth tier, helping them earn promotion to the German third tier.

In 2011, Brückner returned to German Bundesliga club FC St. Pauli. In 2014, he signed for Paloma in the German fifth tier, where he suffered relegation to the German sixth tier.

References

External links

 

1980 births
2. Bundesliga players
3. Liga players
Association football defenders
Association football midfielders
FC St. Pauli players
Holstein Kiel players
Living people
Oberliga (football) players
Regionalliga players
USC Paloma players